Black Zoo is a 1963 American horror film directed by Robert Gordon and starring Michael Gough, Jeanne Cooper, Rod Lauren, Virginia Grey, Jerome Cowan, and Elisha Cook, Jr. It was produced and co-written by Herman Cohen. It is a violent, gore-filled tale.

Plot 
Michael Conrad is a private zookeeper who owns Conrad's Animal Kingdom.  He leads a cult group who literally worship the animals he tends — especially the big cats: 3 lions, a lioness, a pair of cheetahs, a tiger, a cougar, and a black leopard; as well as a gorilla.  Conrad plays organ music to the animals in his living room, and uses them to kill anyone who gets in his way. Conrad is married to Edna and forces his mute son Carl to assist him.

Cast

Production 
Herman Cohen had the idea for the film, and hired Aben Kandel to work with him on the script.

Cohen had worked with Gough previously in Horrors of the Black Museum and Konga.

The animals were provided by Ralph Helfer, most notably Zamba, who played one of the two male lions (Zamba Jr. and Tammy also appeared playing another lion and a lioness, respectively). The zoo was built at Raleigh Studio (formerly Producers Studio) on North Bronson in Hollywood, California.  The entire zoo seen in the picture was an interior set.

Publicity was done with the cats—including an appearance on The Tonight Show Starring Johnny Carson. Cohen did not like the title, preferring Horrors of the Black Zoo.

Home media 
Black Zoo was released on a VHS tape by The Fang (Floral Park, NY) in 2001.

Footnotes

External links 
 

 Black Zoo at a Herman Cohen fansite

1963 films
1963 horror films
American natural horror films
American splatter films
Allied Artists films
Films directed by Robert Gordon
Films scored by Paul Dunlap
1960s English-language films
1960s American films